The Intel-based MacBook Air is a discontinued line of notebook computers developed and manufactured by Apple Inc. from 2008 to 2020. The Air was originally positioned above the previous MacBook line as a premium ultraportable. Since then, the original MacBook's discontinuation in 2011, and lowered prices on subsequent iterations, made the Air Apple's entry-level notebook.

The MacBook Air was introduced in January 2008 with a 13.3-inch screen, and was promoted as the world's thinnest notebook, opening a laptop category known as the ultrabook family. Apple released a redesigned MacBook Air in October 2010, with a redesigned tapered chassis, standard solid-state storage, and added a smaller 11.6-inch version. Later revisions added Intel Core i5 or i7 processors and Thunderbolt. The Retina MacBook Air was released in October 2018, with reduced dimensions, a Retina display, and combination USB-C/Thunderbolt 3 ports for data and power.

The Intel-based MacBook Air was discontinued in November 2020 following the release of the first MacBook Air with Apple silicon based on the Apple M1 processor.

Original (2008–2009) 

Steve Jobs introduced the MacBook Air during Apple's keynote address at the 2008 Macworld conference on January 15, 2008. The original MacBook Air was a 13.3" model, initially promoted as the world's thinnest notebook at 1.9 cm (a previous record holder, 2005's Toshiba Portege R200, was 1.98 cm high). It featured a custom Intel Merom CPU and Intel GMA GPU which were 40% as big as the standard chip package. It also featured an anti-glare LED backlit display, a full-size keyboard, and a large trackpad that responded to multi-touch gestures such as pinching, swiping, and rotating. Since the release of Snow Leopard, the trackpad has also supported handwriting recognition of Chinese characters.

The MacBook Air was the first subcompact notebook offered by Apple after the 12" PowerBook G4 discontinued in 2006. It was also Apple's first computer with an optional solid-state drive. It was Apple's first notebook since the PowerBook 2400c without a built-in removable media drive. To read optical disks, users could either purchase an external USB drive such as Apple's SuperDrive or use the bundled Remote Disc software to access the drive of another computer wirelessly that has the program installed. Either option can also be used to reinstall the system software from the included installation DVD. Remote Disc supports booting over a network, so the Air can boot from its installation DVD in another computer's drive if Remote Install Mac OS X is running on that computer. The software does not allow playing video DVDs or audio CDs, or installing Windows: for these capabilities, an external USB drive is required. More recent versions of OS X replaced the installation DVD with a USB flash drive containing the software, eliminating the need for remote installation. The MacBook Air also does without a FireWire port, Ethernet port, line-in, and a Kensington Security Slot.

On October 14, 2008, a new model was announced with a low-voltage Penryn processor and Nvidia GeForce graphics. Storage capacity was increased to a 128 GB SSD or a 120 GB HDD, and the micro-DVI video port was replaced by the Mini DisplayPort. A mid-2009 version featured slightly higher battery capacity and a faster Penryn CPU.

Design 

Apple incorporated several features in the design of the MacBook Air, such as the reduction of lead to make it more environmentally friendly. The MacBook Air contains no BFRs and PVC wiring, meets Energy Star 5.0 requirements, has a recyclable enclosure, and is rated EPEAT Gold. Its display is made with arsenic-free glass and contains no mercury.

Reception 
On its introduction, the MacBook Air received mixed reviews which praised its portability, but criticized the compromises made in terms of features. The full-sized keyboard, lightness, thinness, and Multi-Touch trackpad were appreciated in reviews, while the limited configuration options and ports, slow speed, non-user-replaceable battery, small hard drive, and price were criticized. The flip-down hatch on the side of the original MacBook Air was a tight fit for some headphone plugs and USB devices, requiring users to purchase an extension cable. Apple removed the flip-down hatch on the late 2010 model in favor of open ports like those of most other laptops.

Some users have complained of CPU lockup caused by overheating. Apple released a software update in early March 2008 to fix the problem with mixed results: the deactivation of one CPU core was corrected; however, some users reported that the runaway kernel problem continued. The problem is aggravated by system-intensive tasks such as video playback or video chatting.

ArsTechnica found "moderate" performance improvements of the 64-GB solid-state drive of the original Air over the standard 80 GB hard drive in tests.

"World's thinnest notebook" 
At the launch of the MacBook Air in January 2008, Steve Jobs said it was the "world's thinnest notebook". This was literally true, but more important was the fact that the MacBook Air was much thinner than mainstream laptops at the time. Its total component integration and use of an entirely new class of Intel processors with a lower TDP and higher integration than previously available made it the first of a new wave of thin performance laptops. Over the years, Apple has removed the claim of being "the world's thinnest notebook" from their marketing materials as other, similarly thin laptops have come to market.

Technical specifications 
All models are obsolete

Redesign (2010–2017) 

On October 20, 2010, Apple released a redesigned 13.3-inch model with a tapered enclosure, higher screen resolution, improved battery, a second USB port, stereo speakers, and standard solid state storage. An 11.6-inch model was introduced, offering reduced cost, weight, battery life, and performance relative to the 13.3-inch model, but better performance than typical netbooks of the time. Both 11-inch and 13-inch models had an analog audio output/headphone minijack supporting Apple earbuds with a microphone. The 13-inch model received a SDXC-capable SD Card slot.

On July 20, 2011, Apple released updated models, which also became Apple's entry-level notebooks due to lowered prices and the discontinuation of the white MacBook around the same time. The Mid 2011 models were upgraded with Sandy Bridge dual-core Intel Core i5 and i7 processors, Intel HD Graphics 3000, backlit keyboards, Thunderbolt, and Bluetooth was upgraded to v4.0. Maximum storage options were increased up to 256 GB. These models use a less expensive "Eagle Ridge" Thunderbolt controller that provides two Thunderbolt channels (2 × 10 Gbit/s bidirectional), compared to the MacBook Pro which uses a "Light Ridge" controller that provides four Thunderbolt channels (4 × 10 Gbit/s bidirectional). This revision also replaced the Expose (F3) key with a Mission Control key, and the Dashboard (F4) key with a Launchpad key.

On June 11, 2012, Apple updated the line with Intel Ivy Bridge dual-core Core i5 and i7 processors, HD Graphics 4000, faster memory and flash storage speeds, USB 3.0, an upgraded 720p FaceTime camera, and a thinner MagSafe 2 charging port. It was the first MacBook Air model to support 9 macOS versions, Mac OS X Lion 10.7 through macOS Catalina 10.15.

On June 10, 2013, Apple updated the line with Haswell processors, Intel HD Graphics 5000, and 802.11ac Wi-Fi. The standard memory was upgraded to 4 GB, with a maximum configuration of 8 GB. Storage started at 128 GB SSD, with options for 256 GB and 512 GB. The Haswell considerably improved battery life from the previous models, and the models are capable of 9 hours on the 11-inch model and 12 hours on the 13-inch model; a team of reviewers exceeded expected battery life ratings during their test. The Mid 2013 model is second MacBook Air that supported 9 macOS versions, OS X Mountain Lion 10.8 through macOS Big Sur 11.

In March 2015, the models were refreshed with Broadwell processors, Intel HD Graphics 6000, Thunderbolt 2, and faster storage and memory. In 2017, the 13-inch model received a processor speed increase from 1.6 GHz to 1.8 GHz and the 11-inch model was discontinued. The 2017 model remained available for sale after Apple launched the Retina MacBook Air in 2018. It was discontinued in July 2019. Before its discontinuation it was Apple's last notebook with USB Type-A ports, MagSafe (until it was reintroduced in 2021), a non-Retina display, a backlit rear Apple logo, and the startup chime (until the introduction of macOS Big Sur in 2020).

Design and upgradability 
Although MacBook Air components are officially non-user-replaceable, third parties do sell upgrade kits for the SSDs. The flash memory and battery are enclosed in the casing, and the RAM is soldered onto the motherboard. The flash memory is difficult to access and has a 128 MB cache and a mSATA connection (updated to a proprietary PCIe interface) to the motherboard.

Issues 
Due to a more mature manufacturing process, the CPUs in the 2010–2017 MacBook Air performs better under load, while the original models ran hotter—the processor needed to be throttled to avoid overheating and this further degraded performance.

On October 17, 2013, Apple announced a replacement program for the 64 GB and 128 GB MacBook Air flash storage drives installed in Air systems purchased between June 2012 and June 2013.

Reception

Comparison with iPad and netbooks 
Although the 11-inch Air is only 0.6 pounds lighter than the 13-inch Air, the biggest difference is the footprint which gives each model a distinct category; the 13-inch Air is much closer in size to most other conventional laptops, while the 11-inch Air is almost small enough to fit in a space that can hold an iPad.

The 11-inch MacBook Air carried the desirable essential attributes of a netbook, but without the drawbacks of a slower processor and less capable operating system, albeit at a higher price. At the low end, Apple introduced the iPad—a different form factor than the netbook, but with improved computing capabilities and lower production cost. Both of these led to a decline in netbook sales, and most PC manufacturers have consequently discontinued their netbook lines in response. Capitalizing on the success of the MacBook Air, Intel promoted ultrabooks as a new high-mobility standard, which has been hailed by some analysts as succeeding where netbooks failed.

Intel's ultrabook competition 
Intel developed a set of specifications for the ultrabook, a higher-end type of subnotebook produced by various PC manufacturers and usually running Windows. Competing directly with the Air, ultrabooks are intended to reduce size and weight, and extend battery life without compromising performance.

Through July 1, 2013, the MacBook Air took in 56 percent of all ultrabook sales in the United States, despite being one of the higher-priced competitors. Apple had previously dominated the premium PC market, in 2009 having a 91 percent market share for PCs priced at more than $1,000, according to NPD, and ultrabooks were an attempt by other PC manufacturers to move in on Apple's turf. While Apple's MacBook lines were not immune to this consumer trend towards mobile devices, they still managed to ship 2.8 million MacBooks in Q2 2012 (the majority of which were the MacBook Air) compared to 500,000 total ultrabooks, despite there being dozens of ultrabooks from various manufacturers on the market while Apple only offered 11-inch and 13-inch models of the Macbook Air. Forrester Research analyst Frank Gillett attributes Apple's increased success in the enterprise market to the 2010 MacBook Air and the iPad.

While several ultrabooks were able to claim individual distinctions such as being the lightest or thinnest, the MacBook Air was regarded by reviewers as the best all-around ultrabook in regard to "OS X experience, full keyboard, superior trackpad, Thunderbolt connector and the higher-quality, all-aluminum unibody construction".

Microsoft's Surface Pro 2 has a similar size and price to the 11-inch MacBook Air; Apple CEO Tim Cook has criticized the Surface Pro and other ultrabook hybrids running the touch-based Windows 8, that attempt to combine PC and tablet functionality in one device, saying that such devices were confusing like trying to "combine a fridge and a toaster".

When released in October 2010, the 13-inch model's screen resolution was higher than the average 1366×768 screens of similar sized laptops. However, by 2013, with many premium ultrabooks having high resolution screens (1080p or greater) as standard or upgrades, the MacBook Air was increasingly criticized for sticking with a low-resolution screen. Many in the tech community had expected Apple to release a MacBook Air with Retina Display by the summer of 2013, similar to the MacBook Pro Retina which came out in 2012. The October 2013 refresh of the 13-inch MacBook Pro Retina, with a slimmer chassis and a lower price point, was mentioned as a potential MacBook Air alternative as the battery life is not much shorter while not being considerably bulkier. Apple released an entry-level version of the 13-inch MacBook Pro on October 27, 2016, which was specifically targeted towards MacBook Air users. A Retina MacBook Air was released in late 2018.

The 11.6-inch MacBook Air, introduced in October 2010, is only slightly larger and heavier (when closed) than the iPad 2. The 11.6-inch Air has been regarded as thin and light compared to other ultraportables, such as the Sony VAIO Z and the 11-inch Samsung Series 9.

As of 2013, several ultrabooks such as the Sony VAIO Pro have managed smaller dimensions than the MacBook Air by using carbon fiber construction.

Technical specifications

Retina (2018–2020) 

On October 30, 2018, Apple released the Retina MacBook Air, with Amber Lake processors, a 13.3-inch Retina display with a resolution of 2560×1600 pixels, Touch ID, a Force Touch trackpad, and two combination USB-C 3.1 gen 2/Thunderbolt 3 ports plus one audio jack. The screen displays 48% more color and the bezels are 50% narrower than the previous non-Retina models, and occupies 17% less volume. Thickness is reduced to 15.6mm and weight to 1.25 kg (2.75 pounds). It is available in three finishes, silver, space gray, and gold. Unlike the  models, this model cannot be configured with an Intel Core i7 processor, possibly because Intel never released the i7-8510Y CPU that would have been used.

The base 2018 model comes with 8 GB of 2133 MHz LPDDR3 RAM, 128 GB SSD, Intel Core i5 processor (1.6 GHz base clock, with Turbo up to 3.6 GHz) and Intel UHD Graphics 617.

Apple released updated models in July 2019 with True Tone display technology using the same components as the Mid 2019 MacBook Pro. A test found that the 256 GB SSD in the 2019 model has a 35% lower read speed than the 256 GB SSD in the 2018 model, though the write speed is slightly faster.

Updated models were released in March 2020 with Ice Lake processors, updated graphics, support for 6K output to run the Pro Display XDR, and replaced the butterfly keyboard with a Magic Keyboard design similar to that found in the 2019 16-inch MacBook Pro.

Design 
The Retina MacBook Air follows the design of the 2010–2017 models with a tapered aluminum enclosure, but takes some design elements from the Retina MacBook and MacBook Pro, such as a flush display with black bezels and a glossy opaque Apple logo on the rear, and an edge-to-edge trackpad.

Apple repair expert Louis Rossmann has criticised the Retina MacBook Air's hardware layout, noting that the fan's position makes it sub-optimal for cooling and can lead to overheating-related issues.

Technical specifications

Supported operating systems

Supported macOS releases 
The patch for the current release of macOS, Big Sur, will work with Wi-Fi on unsupported MacBook Airs from late 2008 and later. Likewise, the patch for macOS Monterey, the next major release, will also support the Late 2008 MacBook Air and later. Graphics acceleration only works on MacBook Airs released in 2012 and later, which have Metal-capable GPUs. As of 2022, the mid-2012 and mid-2013 MacBook Air are the only models officially supported by Apple with 9 versions of the Mac operating system.

Windows through Boot Camp 

Boot Camp Assistant allows Intel Macs to dual-boot Windows.

Timeline

See also 
 MacBook
 MacBook (12-inch)
 MacBook Pro

Notes

References

External links 

  – official site

Air Intel
Computer-related introductions in 2008
Products introduced in 2008
Products and services discontinued in 2020
X86 Macintosh computers
Discontinued Apple Inc. products